AlterEgo is a wearable silent speech output-input device developed by MIT Media Lab. The device is attached around the head, neck, and jawline and translates your brain speech center impulse input into words on a computer, without vocalization.

Description
The device consists of 7 small electrodes that attach at various points around the jaw-line and mouth to receive the electrical inputs to the muscles used for speech. It looks similar to a sling for the head, neck and jaw.

Background
Scientists Arnav Kapur of Fluid Interfaces group at MIT Media Lab with Shreyas Kapur and Pattie Maes designed the prototype and presented the work at the Conference on Intelligent User Interfaces in March 2018, in Tokyo. They reported that, when testing the accuracy of a classifier trained on data where users were instructed to "read the number to themselves, without producing a sound and moving their lips," they were able to classify the digit (between 0 and 9, i.e., ten classes), with 92 percent accuracy rate.

See Also
Silent speech interface 
Imagined speech / Subvocalization

External links
 MIT Alterego overview
 MIT news
 International Conference on Intelligent User Interfaces
 Fluid Interfaces group
 Transcribing the Voice in Your Head

References

Artificial neural networks
Internet of things
Wearable devices
Wearable computers
Augmentative and alternative communication